Grøndahl & Søn Forlag was a Norwegian publishing house established in 1812. Christopher Grøndahl (1784–1864) started it as a print in 1812, before it started commercial publishing in 1875. It was acquired by J.W. Cappelens Forlag in 1990, merged with Dreyers Forlag in 1991 into Grøndahl & Dreyers Forlag. The latter company was merged into Cappelen in 1999.

References

Further reading

Publishing companies established in 1812
Publishing companies of Norway

1999 disestablishments in Norway
Norwegian companies established in 1812